The Gauteng Provincial Legislature is the legislature of the South African province of Gauteng. It is a unicameral body of 73 members elected every five years. The current legislature, the sixth, was elected on 8 May 2019 and has an African National Congress majority of 37 members. The legislature is housed in Johannesburg City Hall in central Johannesburg.

The Gauteng Provincial Legislature, like the eight other provincial legislatures in South Africa, was created on 27 April 1994 by the Interim Constitution of South Africa, which dissolved the four original provinces (and their provincial councils) and created the nine current provinces. It is currently constituted in terms of Chapter Six of the Constitution of South Africa, which defines the structure of the provincial governments.

Powers
The Gauteng Provincial Legislature elects the Premier of Gauteng, the head of Gauteng's provincial executive. The legislature can force the Premier to resign by passing a motion of no confidence. Although the Executive Council is selected by the Premier, the legislature may pass a motion of no confidence to compel the Premier to reshuffle the council. The legislature also appoints Gauteng's delegates to the National Council of Provinces, allocating delegates to parties in proportion to the number of seats each party holds in the legislature.

The legislature has the power to pass legislation in various fields specified in the national constitution; in some fields, the legislative power is shared with the national parliament, while in other fields it is reserved to the province alone. The fields include matters such as health, education (except universities), agriculture, housing, environmental protection, and development planning.

The legislature oversees the administration of the Gauteng provincial government, and the Gauteng Premier and the members of the Executive Council are required to report to the legislature on the performance of their responsibilities. The legislature also manages the financial affairs of the provincial government by way of the appropriation bills which determine the annual provincial budget.

Election 
The provincial legislature consists of 73 members, who are elected through a system of party list proportional representation with closed lists. In other words, each voter casts a vote for one political party, and seats in the legislature are allocated to the parties in proportion to the number of votes received. The seats are then filled by members in accordance with lists submitted by the parties before the election.

The legislature is elected for a term of five years, unless it is dissolved early. This may occur if the legislature votes to dissolve and it is at least three years since the last election, or if the Premiership falls vacant and the legislature fails to elect a new Premier within ninety days. By convention all nine provincial legislatures and the National Assembly are elected on the same day.

The most recent election was held on 8 May 2019. The following table summarises the results.

The following table shows the composition of the provincial parliament after past elections and floor-crossing periods.

Officers
The Speaker is the political head of the legislature, and is assisted by a Deputy Speaker. The Speaker is Ntombi Lentheng Mekgwe and her deputy is Nomvuyo Mhlakaza-Manamela; they are both members of the African National Congress. The following people have served as Speaker:

Member

References

External links
 Official website

Legislature
Provincial legislatures of South Africa
Unicameral legislatures